The subcutaneous tissue, also called the hypodermis, hypoderm, subcutis, superficial fascia, is the lowermost layer of the integumentary system in vertebrates. The types of cells found in the layer are fibroblasts, adipose cells, and macrophages. The subcutaneous tissue is derived from the mesoderm, but unlike the dermis, it is not derived from the mesoderm's dermatome region. It consists primarily of loose connective tissue, and contains larger blood vessels and nerves than those found in the dermis. It is a major site of fat storage in the body.

In arthropods, a hypodermis can refer to an epidermal layer of cells that secretes the chitinous cuticle. The term also refers to a layer of cells lying immediately below the epidermis of plants.

Structure
 Fibrous bands anchoring the skin to the deep fascia
 Collagen and elastin fibers attaching it to the dermis
 Fat is absent from the eyelids, clitoris, penis, much of pinna, and scrotum
 Blood vessels on route to the dermis
 Lymphatic vessels on route from the dermis
 The glandular part of some sweat glands; mammary glands lie entirely within the subcutaneous tissue (which are modified apocrine sweat glands)
 Cutaneous nerves and free endings
 Hair follicle roots
 Ruffini and Pacinian corpuscles
 Mast cells
 Bursae, in the space overlying joints in order to facilitate smooth passage of overlying skin
 Fine, flat sheets of muscle, in certain locations, including the scalp, face, hand, nipple, and scrotum, called the panniculus carnosus

In some animals, such as whales and hibernating mammals, the hypodermis forms an important insulating layer and/or food store.

In some plants, the hypodermis is a layer of cells immediately below the epidermis of leaves. It is often mechanically strengthened, for example, in pine leaves, forming an extra protective layer or a water storage tissue.

Subcutaneous fat 

Subcutaneous fat is the layer of subcutaneous tissue that is most widely distributed. It is composed of adipocytes, which are grouped together in lobules separated by connective tissue. The number of adipocytes varies among different areas of the body, while their size varies according to the body's nutritional state. It acts as padding and as an energy reserve, as well as providing some minor thermoregulation via insulation. Subcutaneous fat is found just beneath the skin, as opposed to visceral fat, which is found in the peritoneal cavity, and can be measured using body fat calipers to give a rough estimate of total body adiposity.

Clinical significance

Injection

Injection into the subcutaneous tissue is a route of administration used for drugs such as insulin: because it is highly vascular, the tissue absorbs drugs quickly. Subcutaneous injection is believed to be the most effective manner to administer some drugs, such as human growth hormones. Just as the subcutaneous tissue can store fat, it can also provide good storage space for drugs that need to be released gradually because there is limited blood flow. "Skin popping" is a slang term that includes this method of administration, and is usually used in association with recreational drugs.

Disease
 Subcutaneous abscess
 Subcutaneous tumor

See also
 Dermis
 Epidermis

References

Skin anatomy